Geotail was a satellite that observed the Earth's magnetosphere.  It was developed by Japan's ISAS in association with the United States' NASA, and was launched by a Delta II rocket on 24 July 1992 from Cape Canaveral Air Force Station.

The primary purpose of this mission is to study the structure and dynamics of the tail region of the magnetosphere with a comprehensive set of scientific instruments. This orbit also allowed it to study the boundary region of the magnetosphere as it skims the magnetopause at perigees. In the first two years the double lunar swing-by technique was used to keep apogees in the distant magnetotail. This involved 14 lunar flybys.

In 1993 the computer that controls the Low Energy Particles experiment locked up. Attempts to reset it failed. This problem was solved by changing the trajectory of the craft during a lunar flyby that took place on 26 September 1993 so that it passed through the shadow of the moon. Power from the batteries was cut while this took place. When the craft left the shadow of the moon, power returned and the computer started working again.

The present orbit is  ×  with inclination of -7° to the ecliptic plane."

Geotail instruments studied electric fields, magnetic fields, plasmas, energetic particles, and plasma waves.

In 1994 the principal investigator of the Plasma Wave Instrument (PWI),  the experiment complement, was Professor Hiroshi Matsumoto of Kyoto University, with co-investigators from NASA, the University of Iowa, and STX Corporation.
Geotail is an active mission . Geotail, WIND, Polar, SOHO, and Cluster were all part of the International Solar-Terrestrial Physics Science Initiative (ISTP) project.

In June of 2022, the second and final of Geotails two data recorders failed, jeopardizing science observation.  It was decided to terminate the operation, and the spacecraft was deactivated on 28 November 2022.

Discoveries

Geotail data has been used to show that flux transfer events move faster than the ambient medium through the Magnetosphere. Those within the Magnetosheath were shown to move both faster and slower than the ambient medium.

During the lunar flybys Geotail identified oxygen, silicon, sodium and aluminium in the lunar atmosphere.

See also 

 International Solar-Terrestrial Physics Science Initiative
 Tom Krimigis

References

External links 
JAXA | Magnetospheric Observation Satellite (GEOTAIL)
GEOTAIL Magnetosphere Tail Observation Satellite | Spacecraft
NASA Polar, Wind, and Geotail Projects

Geospace monitoring satellites
Satellites of Japan
Satellites of the United States
Spacecraft launched by Delta II rockets
Spacecraft launched in 1992